Kofi Okyir (born 7 June 1951) is a Ghanaian former athlete.

A specialist sprinter, Okyir ran for Angelo State University in Texas and was a teammate of Ghanaian long jumper Joshua Owusu, who he grew up with in Kumasi and had recommended Okyir to recruiters. Okyir was the NAIA champion in the 100 yard dash in 1973.

Okyir won 4 x 100 metres silver medals at the 1973 All-Africa Games and 1974 British Commonwealth Games. He holds the African record for the 100 yard dash, setting a mark of 9.40 seconds in Austin in 1974.

References

External links

1951 births
Living people
Ghanaian male sprinters
Athletes (track and field) at the 1973 All-Africa Games
Athletes (track and field) at the 1974 British Commonwealth Games
African Games silver medalists for Ghana
Commonwealth Games silver medallists for Ghana
African Games medalists in athletics (track and field)
Commonwealth Games medallists in athletics
Angelo State Rams athletes
Sportspeople from Kumasi
Athletes (track and field) at the 1970 British Commonwealth Games
Medallists at the 1974 British Commonwealth Games